Indawis a town in northern Burma, in Sagaing Division, Katha District, Indaw Township. It is located about 2 km south-east of Indaw Lake.  The rail junction at Naba is located about 6 km to the north-east of the town.

History

In 1944 during World War II, a major campaign was fought in Indaw between Japanese and British forces. The Japanese had two airfields at Indaw, the Indaw West strip  and the Indaw Lake strip.

Notes

External links
 "Indaw Map — Satellite Images of Indaw", Maplandia

Populated places in Katha District
Township capitals of Myanmar
Indaw Township